Akbulatovo (Aqbulat) is a rural locality (a village) in Kiyekbayevsky Selsoviet, Burzyansky District, Bashkortostan, Russia. The population was 5 as of 2010. There is 1 street.

Geography 
Akbulatovo is located 33 km southwest of Starosubkhangulovo (the district's administrative centre) by road. Gadelgareyevo is the nearest rural locality.

References 

Rural localities in Burzyansky District